Tramonti di Sopra (local variant Vildisora) is a comune (municipality) in the Province of Pordenone in the Italian autonomous region Friuli-Venezia Giulia, located about  northwest of Trieste and about  northeast of Pordenone.

Tramonti di Sopra is the traditional home of the "pitina", a particular meat ball, smoked with aromas and herbs (i.e. juniper). Other local food include "Formaj dal CIt", a typical cottage cheese flavour with pepper.

Tramonti di Sopra borders the following municipalities: Claut, Forni di Sotto, Frisanco, Meduno, Socchieve, Tramonti di Sotto.

References

Cities and towns in Friuli-Venezia Giulia